Robert Wambua Mbithi (born 26 June 1989) is a male long-distance runner from Kenya.

Achievements

References

1989 births
Living people
Kenyan male long-distance runners